Philippe Ardant (July 21, 1929 – June 6, 2007) was a French jurist, former president of the Constitutional Court of the principality of Andorra, former president of the Arab World Institute and former president of Panthéon-Assas University. He had been a professor at the universities of Poitiers, Beirut and Panthéon-Assas. He had co-founded Pouvoirs, a journal of constitutional law and political science.

References

1929 births
2007 deaths
French jurists
Presidents of Panthéon-Assas University
Academic staff of Paris 2 Panthéon-Assas University